Francis Trouble is the fourth solo album by Albert Hammond Jr released on March 9, 2018, through Red Bull Records. The album is named after Hammond's twin brother Francis who his mother miscarried in 1980 and was described as "a homage to both the death of his twin and his own birth, as well as the complexities of identity that arise because of their intermingling."

It was announced alongside the release of the single "Muted Beatings", which was described by NME as "optimising Hammond’s knack for huge guitar-pop hooks but laden with intricacies aplenty."

Critical reception 

Francis Trouble received generally favorable reviews according to Metacritic who assigned the album an average score of 73, based on 11 critics. Critics praised the album's energy and its "emphasis on melody and propulsion above all else."

Many also praised the inspiration from a wide amount of different genres including on the song 'Screamer' described by NME as "frenetic surf-rock." However, others were critical towards the album with Rolling Stone criticizing its short length and describing it as forgettable.

Track listing

Personnel 
Credits taken from AllMusic

Musicians
Albert Hammond Jr. - vocals, guitar
Hammarsing Kharhmar - guitar
Colin Killalea - guitar, saxophone
Jordan Brooks - bass guitar
Jeremy Gustin - drums

Additional personnel
Gus Oberg - producer, mixing
Joe LaPorta - mastering engineer
Liz Hirsch - design, illustrations

Charts

References 

2018 albums
Albert Hammond Jr. albums
Red Bull Records albums